Suttons Bay can refer to a community in the United States:

 The village of Suttons Bay, Michigan
 Suttons Bay Township, Michigan